Jarplund-Weding is a former municipality in the district of Schleswig-Flensburg, in Schleswig-Holstein, Germany. On March 1, 2008 the municipality was incorporated into the municipality Handewitt.

Jaruplund Højskole is located in the town.

Villages in Schleswig-Holstein
Former municipalities in Schleswig-Holstein